Marina Bassols Ribera (born 13 December 1999) is a Spanish tennis player.

Bassols Ribera has a career-high WTA ranking of 121 in singles, achieved on 28 November 2022. She also has a career-high WTA ranking of 194 in doubles, achieved on 15 August 2022.

Bassols Ribera made her WTA Tour main-draw debut at the 2021 Palermo Ladies Open in the singles and doubles events.

She entered the 2023 Monterrey Open as a lucky loser.

Performance timeline

Singles
Current after the 2023 Monterrey Open.

WTA 125 tournament finals

Doubles: 1 (1 runner-up)

ITF finals

Singles: 13 (8 titles, 5 runner–ups)

Doubles: 13 (7 titles, 6 runner–up)

References

External links
 
 

1999 births
Living people
Spanish female tennis players
Competitors at the 2018 Mediterranean Games
Mediterranean Games bronze medalists for Spain
Mediterranean Games medalists in tennis